Heist is a municipality in the district of Pinneberg, in Schleswig-Holstein, Germany.

Geography
Heist is located on the Geestrand adjacent to the Haseldorfer Marsch, in which the municipality also has a share. The municipality borders Holm in the south, Hetlingen, Haseldorf and Haselau in the west, Moorrege in the north and Appen in the east.

References

Municipalities in Schleswig-Holstein
Pinneberg (district)